National Route 52 is a national highway of Japan connecting Shimizu-ku, Shizuoka and Kōfu, Yamanashi.

Route data
Length: 100.1 km (62.2 mi).

History
Route 52 was originally designated on 18 May 1953 as a section of National Route 141. After it was extended to Kōfu, this section was redesignated as Route 52 when the route was promoted to a Class 1 highway.

References

052
Roads in Shizuoka Prefecture
Roads in Yamanashi Prefecture